Wahnfried is Richard Wagner's villa in Bayreuth, Germany.

Wahnfried may also refer to:

Richard Wahnfried (now simply "Wahnfried"), an alias for German composer and musician Klaus Schulze
Wahnfried (film), a 1986 film about Wagner 
Sire of Der Löwe (1944–1973), a German Thoroughbred stallion

See also